School District 19 Revelstoke is a public school district in Revelstoke, British Columbia.

Schools

References

See also
List of school districts in British Columbia

Revelstoke, British Columbia
19